Niklida is a rural locality (a selo) in Mazadinsky Selsoviet, Tlyaratinsky District, Republic of Dagestan, Russia. The population was 173 as of 2010.

Geography 
Niklida is located 30 km north of Tlyarata (the district's administrative centre) by road. Rosta is the nearest rural locality.

References 

Rural localities in Tlyaratinsky District